Robert Edward Bercich (born November 9, 1936 in Chicago, Illinois) is a former American football safety in the National Football League for the Dallas Cowboys. He played college football at Michigan State University.

Early years
Bercich attended Argo Community High School, before moving on to Michigan State University. As a sophomore, he was moved between halfback and fullback. He became a starter at fullback as a junior and split time with Park Baker.

Professional career

New York Giants
The New York Giants selected Bercich in the fifteenth round (179th overall) of the 1959 NFL Draft with a future draft pick, which allowed the team to draft him before his college eligibility was over. He was also drafted by the Los Angeles Chargers in the second round of the 1960 AFL Draft. He was released on September 5, 1960.

Dallas Cowboys
On September 8, 1960, he was claimed off waivers by the Dallas Cowboys. He became the first starter (6 starts) at strong safety in franchise history, while splitting time with Gary Wisener (3 starts) and Fred Doelling (3 starts). He finished with 46 tackles (19 solo), 2 interceptions and 11 passes defensed.

In 1961, he suffered a concussion during the seventh game against the New York Giants and did not play another contest in the season. The next year, he missed the pre-season with a knee injury and was released before the start of the 1962 season.

Personal life
His son Pete Bercich played and coached in the NFL for the Minnesota Vikings.

References

1936 births
Living people
People from Cook County, Illinois
Players of American football from Illinois
American football safeties
Michigan State Spartans football players
Dallas Cowboys players
American people of Slavic descent